Zeka Laplaine (born 1960), sometimes credited as José Laplaine, is a director and actor from Ilebo in the Democratic Republic of the Congo. The child of a Portuguese father and Congolese mother, he moved to Europe when he was 18. His 1996 short film Le Clandestin was featured at the 2010 Amakula International Film Festival in Uganda. He portrayed a cowboy alongside Danny Glover in Death in Timbuktu, a film within a film in the Council of Europe Film Award-winning film, Bamako. Laplaine is a member of France's "Guilde Africaine des Realisateurs et Producteurs".

Laplaine's first short film was Le Clandestin, which he wrote, directed and acted in (playing a policeman in charge of a container dock in Lisbon). A French production set in Portugal, Le Clandestin examines African emigration and questions the dream of Europe as a "Northern Paradise" for immigrants.

Filmography

Actor

References

Sources

Bibliography

External links
 

Democratic Republic of the Congo film directors
1960 births
Living people